The 63rd Assembly District of Wisconsin is one of 99 districts in the Wisconsin State Assembly.  Located in southeast Wisconsin, the district covers most of the south half of Racine County west of Wisconsin Highway 31, including the city of Burlington and the villages of Rochester, Union Grove, and Sturtevant, as well as most of the village of Mount Pleasant and part of the city of Racine. The district is represented by Republican Robin Vos, the Speaker of the Assembly, since 2005.

The 63rd Assembly District is located within Wisconsin's 21st Senate district, along with the 61st and 62nd Assembly Districts.

List of past representatives

Electoral history

References 

Wisconsin State Assembly districts
Racine County, Wisconsin